Medoc noir is an alternative name to several wine grape varieties including

Malbec
Merlot
Mornen noir
Menior, Hungarian wine grape that is known as Medoc noir in Hungary and was once though to be the same variety as Mornen noir